Lubiniezky is a lava-flooded lunar impact crater on the northwest edge of Mare Nubium. It was named after Polish astronomer Stanisław Lubieniecki. This feature is most readily located by finding the prominent crater Bullialdus to the southeast.

The floor of Lubiniezky has been resurfaced by basaltic lava, which most likely entered from the surrounding mare through the gap in the southeast wall. The surviving rim forms a curved, worn rise around the relatively flat and featureless inner floor. The rim is joined by ridges attached to the north and west walls. To the north of this feature is the bowl-shaped crater Darney. The associated craters Lubiniezky A and E are also flooded, and lie to the northwest.

Satellite craters
By convention these features are identified on lunar maps by placing the letter on the side of the crater midpoint that is closest to Lubiniezky.

References

External links
 Oblique photo of Lubiniezky A from Apollo 16: AS16-119-19105

Impact craters on the Moon